Vale fantasia (Greek: Βάλε φαντασία; English: Show imagination) is the second studio album of Greek artist, Mariada Pieridi. It was released on 3 October 2003 by Universal Music Greece and later received gold certification, selling 30,000 units in Greece and it is her most popular and successful album.

Track listing

Singles 
The following singles were officially released to radio stations, three of them with music videos. The songs "Pou pas", "Lathos himeia" and "I kardia", despite not having been released as singles, managed to also receive radio airplay.

 "Oute ki esi" (Neither You)
 "Meine dipla mou" (Stay By My Side)
 "Rotisa" (I Asked)
 "Vale fantasia" (Show Imagination)
 "Ena" (One)
 "Aplose ta heria sou" (Reach Out Your Hands)
 "Iparhoun kati antres" (There Are Some Men)

Credits 
Credits adapted by liner notes.

Personnel 

 Giannis Bithikotsis – bouzouki, baglama (tracks: 3, 5, 9, 11) / cura (tracks: 3, 5, 7, 9, 11)
 Giorgos Chatzopoulos – guitars (tracks: 2, 3, 4, 5, 7, 8, 9, 10, 11, 13, 14)
 Vasilis Iliadis – säz (tracks: 6, 8, 10) / cümbüş (tracks: 10)
 Katerina Kiriakou – backing vocals (tracks: 4, 5, 6, 7, 8, 9, 10, 11, 13, 14)
 Kostas Liolios – drums (tracks: 3, 5, 7, 8, 9, 13)
 Fedon Lionoudakis – accordion (tracks: 5, 10)
 Alex Panagi – backing vocals (tracks: 4, 5, 6, 7, 8, 9, 10, 11, 13, 14)
 Thanasis Vasilopoulos – clarinet, ney (tracks: 7, 8)
 Alexandros Vourazelis – orchestration, programming, keyboards

Production 

 Christos Chatzistamou – mastering
 Dimitris Chorianopoulos – sound engineer, mix engineer
 Thodoris Chrisanthopoulos – manufacturing
 Al Giga – styling
 Giorgos Kalfamanolis – photographer
 Panos Kallitsis – hair styling, make up
 Dimitris Panagiotakopoulos – art direction
 Thanasis Paschalis – sound engineer
 Alexandros Vourazelis – production manager

Charts 
Vale Fantasia made its debut at number 9 on the 'Top 50 Greek Albums' charts by IFPI.

After months, it was certified gold according to sales.

References 

2003 albums
Greek-language albums
Mariada Pieridi albums
Universal Music Greece albums